Arena Stage is a not-for-profit regional theater based in Southwest, Washington, D.C. Established in 1950, it was the first racially integrated theater in Washington, D.C.  and its founders helped start the U.S. regional theater movement. It is located at a theater complex called the Mead Center for American Theater. The theater's Artistic Director is Molly Smith and the Executive Producer is Edgar Dobie. It is the largest company in the country dedicated to American plays and playwrights. Arena Stage commissions and develops new plays through its Power Plays initiative. The company now serves an annual audience of more than 300,000. Its productions have received numerous local and national awards, including the Tony Award for best regional theater and over 600 Helen Hayes Awards.

History

Founding, location, and theaters 
The theatre company was founded in Washington, D.C. in 1950 by Zelda and Thomas Fichandler and Edward Mangum. Its first home was the Hippodrome Theatre, a former movie house. In 1956, the company moved into the gymnasium of the old Heurich Brewery in Foggy Bottom; the theater was nicknamed "The Old Vat." The brewery was demolished in 1961 to make way for the approaches to the Theodore Roosevelt Bridge and the Kennedy Center.

In 1960, the company moved into its current complex on Sixth St, which was built for them by Chicago architect Harry Weese. He also designed the Arena’s Kreeger Theater, which opened in 1970. In 1966, Robert Alexander joined the company and created the Living Stage as a social outreach improvisational theater.

Inclusion and diversity focus 
Arena was the first theatre in D.C. to be racially integrated. It's production The Great White Hope, which opened at Arena Stage in 1967, went on to Broadway with its original cast, including James Earl Jones and Jane Alexander in the lead roles. This made Arena the first regional theater to transfer a production to Broadway. When Arena Stage reprised the play in 2000 as part of its 50th anniversary celebration, Mahershala Ali was cast as the male lead. It was his first professional role.

In 1968, the company received a $250,000 grant from the Ford Foundation.  Part of it was to be used for the training of Black actors. In 1987, Arena hosted a symposium on nontraditional casting. In 1989, the company received a $1 million grant from the National Endowment for the Arts to train minority actors, directors, designers and administrators, and to produce plays from non-white cultures.

In the latter half of the 20th century, the company traveled abroad. In 1973, they performed Thornton Wilder’s Our Town and Jerome Lawrence and Robert E. Lee’s Inherit the Wind in the Soviet Union after being invited by the U.S. State Department to do so.  This made them the first regional theater to present U.S. plays in the former USSR.

Arena Stage also became the first American theater company to be invited to the Hong Kong Arts Festival in 1980, and then attended the Israel Festival in Jerusalem in 1987. In the U.S., to promote cultural diversity, Zelda Fichandler included plays from the Soviet Union, Romania, Poland, Hungary, Austria, East and West Germany, France, Switzerland, England, Canada, and Australia in the theater's repertoire.  In 1991, Arena raised $4 million for a cultural diversity grant. This became the Allen Lee Hughes Fellowship Program.

In 1981, Arena developed Audio Description for visually impaired audiences. This made the company the first theater to create audio-described performances.

In 1976, Arena Stage became the first theater outside New York to receive a special Tony Award for theatrical excellence.

Original plays and films 
In 2016, Molly Smith announced the Power Plays initiative to commission 25 original plays and musicals over the next 10 years to showcase American history from 1776 to modern day. Including works by Jacqueline Lawton, Eve Ensler, Rajiv Joseph, Mary Kathryn Nagle, Sarah Ruhl, Lawrence Wright, Eduardo Machado, Aaron Posner, John Strand, Craig Lucas, Kenneth Lin, and Nathan Alan Davis.

During the coronavirus pandemic, Arena Stage launched the Artists Marketplace as a way for people to commission or purchase work from the artists who have worked with the company. The company also produced three films: May 22, 2020, a docudrama that follows D.C.-Maryland-Virginia residents and captures a day in their lives during the pandemic; Inside Voices, which features the stories of kids during the pandemic; and The 51st State, about D.C. statehood.

In 2021, the company released a three-part commissioned music series called Arena Riffs.

Timeline

Renovation 2008–2010

A major renovation of the facility was undertaken from 2008 through 2010. The architect for the project was Bing Thom Architects of Vancouver, British Columbia, Canada who contracted Fast + Epp consulting engineers to design the main columns for the building.  During the renovation, Arena Stage temporarily moved to the Crystal Forum and the Lincoln Theatre.

The Arena’s existing theaters, the Fichandler Stage and the Kreeger Theater, were enclosed along with a new theater, the Arlene and Robert Kogod Cradle, under a glass “skin”. The entire $135 million complex was renamed "Arena Stage at the Mead Center for American Theater" in honor of supporters Gilbert and Jaylee Mead. The new building includes a central lobby, restaurant, rehearsal rooms, classrooms, production shops, offices, and the Catwalk Cafe. The restaurant, Richard's Place, is closed for the 2021-2022 season. For the first time in the company's history, all staff and operations joined under one unifying roof. The three-stage theater complex is now the second-largest performing arts center in Washington, DC, after the Kennedy Center for the Performing Arts, and is the largest regional theater in D.C. Arena Stage re-opened in October 2010 with “Oklahoma!”

The capacity of its three theaters follows:

The Fichandler Stage, a theater in the round, seating 680.
The Kreeger Theater, a modified thrust stage theater, seating 510.
The Kogod Cradle, a 202-seat space dedicated to new American productions.

Artistic Directors 
One of the founders, Zelda Fichandler, was the company's artistic director from its founding through the 1990/91 season. Douglas C. Wager succeeded her for the 1991/92 through 1997/98 seasons. The current artistic director, Molly Smith, assumed those duties beginning with the 1998/99 season. In June 2022, she announced she would retire and leave Arena Stage in July 2023.

Recent production history

2017–2018 season  
 The Originalist, by John Strand, directed by Molly Smith. July 7–30, 2017.
Native Gardens, by Karen Zacarías, directed by Blake Robison, a co-production with Guthrie Theater. September 15 – October 22, 2017.
The Price, by Arthur Miller, directed by Seema Sueko. October 6 – November 5, 2017.
The Pajama Game, book by George Abbott and Richard Bissell, music and lyrics by Richard Adler and Jerry Ross, directed by Alan Paul. October 27 – December 24, 2017.
Nina Simone: Four Women, by Christina Ham, directed by Timothy Douglas. November 10 – December 24, 2017.
Sovereignty, by Mary Kathryn Nagle, directed by Molly Smith. January 12 – February 18, 2018.
The Great Society, by Robert Schenkkan, directed by Kyle Donnelly. February 2 – March 11, 2018.
Hold These Truths, by Jeanne Sakata, directed by Jessica Kubzansky. February 23 – April 8, 2018.
Two Trains Running, by August Wilson, directed by Juliette Carrillo, a co-production with Seattle Repertory Theatre. March 30 – April 29, 2018.
Snow Child, based on the novel by Eowyn Ivey, book by John Strand, music by Bob Banghart and Georgia Stitt, lyrics by Georgia Stitt, directed by Molly Smith, a world-premiere co-production with Perseverance Theatre.  April 13 – May 20, 2018.

2018–2019 season 
Dave, book by Thomas Meehan (writer) & Nell Benjamin, music by Tom Kitt (musician), lyrics by Nell Benjamin, directed by Tina Landau. July 13 – August 19, 2018.
Turn Me Loose, by Gretchen Law, directed by John Gould Rubin. September 6 – October 14, 2018.
Anything Goes, by Cole Porter, directed by Molly Smith, choreography by Parker Esse. November 2 – December 23, 2018.
Indecent, by Paula Vogel, directed by Eric Rosen. November 23 – December 30, 2018.
Kleptocracy, by Kenneth Lin. January 18 – February 24, 2019.
The Heiress, by Ruth Goetz & Augustus Goetz, directed by Seema Sueko. February 8 – March 10, 2019.
JQA, written and directed by Aaron Posner. March 1 – April 14, 2019.
Junk, by Ayad Akhtar, directed by Jackie Maxwell. April 5 – May 5, 2019.
Jubilee, written and directed by Tazewell Thompson. April 26 – June 2, 2019.

2019-2020 season 
Some of the plays from the 2020 season were postponed due to the pandemic. They instead ran during the 2021-2022 season.
Ann by Holland Taylor, directed by Kristen van Ginhoven. July 11 - August 11, 2019.
Jitney by August Wilson. September 13 - October 20, 2019.
Right to Be Forgotten by Sharyn Rothstein, directed by Seema Sueko. October 11 - November 10, 2019.
Disney's Newsies, music by Alan Menken, lyrics by Jack Feldman, book by Harvey Fierstein, directed by Molly Smith. November 1 - December 22, 2020.
Dear Jack, Dear Louise, by Ken Ludwig, directed by Jackie Maxwell. November 21 - December 29, 2019.
A Thousand Splendid Suns, adapted by Ursula Rani Sarma, directed by Casey Perloff. January 17 - February 20, 2020.
Mother Road, by Octavio Solis, directed by Bill Rauch. February 28 - April 12, 2020.
Celia and Fidel by Eduardo Muchado, directed by Molly Smith. February 28 - April 12, 2020.
Seven Guitars, by August Wilson. April 3 - May 3, 2020.
Toni Stone, by Lydia Diamond, directed by Pam MacKinnon. April 23 - May 31, 2020

2021-2022 season 

 Toni Stone, by Lydia R. Diamond, directed by Pam MacKinnon. September 3 - October 3, 2021. Virtual streaming in Nationals Park on September 26, 2021.
 Celia and Fidel. by Eduardo Machado, directed by Molly Smith. October 8 - November 21, 2021.
 Seven Guitars, by August Wilson, directed by Tazewell Thompson. November 26 - December 26, 2021.
 Change Agent, written and directed by Craig Lucas. January 21 - March 6, 2022.
 Catch Me If You Can, book by Terrence McNally, music by Marc Shaiman, lyrics by Scott Wittman and Marc Shaiman, directed by Molly Smith. March 4 - April 17, 2022.
 Drumfolk. May 31 - June 26, 2022

2022-2023 season 

 American Prophet: Frederick Douglass in His Own Words, book by Charles Randolph-Wright and Marcus Hummon, music and lyrics by Marcus Hummon, directed by Charles Randolph-Wright. July 15 - August 28, 2022.
 Holiday, by Philip Barry, directed by Anita Maynard-Losh. October 7 - November 6, 2022.
 Sanctuary City, by Martyna Majok, directed by David Mendizabal. A co-production with Berkeley Repertory Theatre. October 21 - November 27, 2022.
 Ride the Cyclone, by Brooke Maxwell and Jacob Richmond, directed by Sarah Rasmussen. A co-production with McCarter Theatre Center. January 13 - February 19, 2023.
 The High Ground, by Nathan Alan Davis, directed by Megan Sandberg-Zakian. February 10 - April 2, 2023.
 Angels in America, Part One: Millennium Approaches, by Tony Kushner, directed by János Szász. March 24 - April 23, 2023.
 Exclusion, written by Kenneth Lin, directed by Trip Cullman. May 5 - June 25, 2023.

Original Works 

 Camp David by Lawence Wright 
 Celia and Fidel by Eduardo Machado 
 JQA by Aaron Posner 
 The Originalist by John Strand 
 Change Agent by Craig Lucas 
 Exclusion by Kenneth Lin 
 The High Ground by Nathan Alan Davis

Notable performers

Notable events
The Washingtonian magazine, as part of its 50th anniversary commemoration, identified the Arena Stage's 1967 production of The Great White Hope as one of "50 Moments That Shaped Washington, DC". The play received a lot of attention, some of it negative, because it featured an interracial relationship between James Earl Jones, then a new actor, and Jane Alexander. It would go on to become one of the first regional-theater productions to move to Broadway where it won several Tony Awards, a Pulitzer Prize, and was turned into a film. Zelda Fichandler worked with the writer of the play for a year to make it production-ready. The Arena did not earn a share of the play’s Boadway and film profits.

See also

 Theater in Washington D.C.
 Architecture of Washington, D.C.

Archival material 
A collection of the Arena Stage Records and materials is housed at the George Mason University Special Collections Research Center. The Research Center also houses materials related to individuals involved with the theater, including personal records of Zelda Fichandler's, Thomas Fichandler's papers, the Ken Kitch papers, and materials relating to the Living Stage.

References

External links
 Arena Stage official website

Google Virtual Tour of Arena Stage

1950 establishments in Washington, D.C.
League of Resident Theatres
League of Washington Theatres
Members of the Cultural Alliance of Greater Washington
Performing groups established in 1950
Regional theatre in the United States
Theatre companies in Washington, D.C.
Theatres in Washington, D.C.
Tony Award winners